DaVinci was a development tool used to create HTML5 mobile applications and media content. It includes a jQuery framework, a JavaScript library that can be used by developers and designers to create web applications used on mobile devices with a user experience similar to native applications. Business applications, games, and rich media content, such as HTML5 multi-media magazines, advertisements and animation, may be produced with the tool. DaVinci is based on standard web technology, including HTML5, CSS3 and JavaScript.

Features
DaVinci is composed of DaVinci Studio and DaVinci Animator, which handle application programming and UI design, respectively. The tool has a What You See Is What You Get authoring environment where users may drag and drop components to build applications and design web content.

Open source libraries, such as KnockOut, JsRender/JsViews, Impress.js and turn.js are included in the tool. Other open source frameworks may also be integrated.

The Model View Controller (MVC) and Data Binding in JavaScript can be handled through DaVinci's Data-Set Editor. Here, view components and model data may be visually bound, which allows users to create web applications with server integrated UI components without coding.

DaVinci also includes a N-Screen editor, which automatically applies designs and functions to the screen size of various devices, such as smartphones, tablet PCs, and smartTV.

DaVinci and jQuery
DaVinci has worked closely with the jQuery Foundation in presenting the first jQuery conference in an Asian district on November 12, 2012, in Seoul, South Korea. DaVinci was used as a tool to demonstrate application development techniques at the conference.

See also
 Multiple phone web-based application framework
 Mobile application development

References

External links
 Official Website (dead)
 Tutorials

Mobile web
HTML5
JavaScript
Mobile technology
Programming tools
JavaScript libraries